Ezra Taylor (born 12 August 1994) is a British professional boxer.

Amateur career
Taylor made a name for himself in the British amateur boxing circuit, being the first person to acquire five regional titles at the same time.

Professional career
On 7 March 2020 Taylor made his professional debut, stopping his opponent with a big left hook in the second round, securing his victory against Jevgenijs Andrejevs at Harvey Hadden Sports Village, Nottingham, England.

Professional boxing record

References

1994 births
Living people
Black British sportspeople
Boxers from Nottingham
British male boxers
Light-heavyweight boxers